Borowiecki (feminine: Borowiecka; plural: Borowieccy) is a surname of Polish-language origin. It may refer to:
Mark Borowiecki (born 1989), Canadian professional ice hockey player
Sławomir Borowiecki (born 1977), Polish pair skater

Polish-language surnames